Micro Men is a 2009 one-off BBC drama television programme set in the late 1970s and the early-mid 1980s, about the rise of the British home computer market. It focuses on the rivalry between Sir Clive Sinclair (played by Alexander Armstrong), who developed the ZX Spectrum, and Chris Curry (played by Martin Freeman), the man behind the BBC Micro.

Plot 
The drama is centred on two of the leading players and their respective companies in the home computer market of the late 1970s and early 1980s focusing on the race to win a grant from the BBC to become the provider of a home computer for the BBC's programming for schools. Certain parts of the drama are based on historical fact while others are a dramatisation.

The main characters are ZX Spectrum creator Clive Sinclair and BBC Micro creators Chris Curry, Sophie Wilson, Steve Furber and Hermann Hauser.  The real-life Wilson also makes a brief cameo as a barmaid.

Cast 
 Alexander Armstrong as Clive Sinclair
 Martin Freeman as Chris Curry
 Edward Baker-Duly as Hermann Hauser
 Sam Phillips as Steve Furber
 Stefan Butler as Roger Wilson
 Colin Michael Carmichael as Jim Westwood
 Derek Riddell as Nigel Searle

Cameo
 Sophie Wilson plays a pub landlady.
 Chris Serle and Ian McNaught-Davis also appear through the incorporation of stock footage from The Computer Programme.

Production

Development 
The programme was created by independent production company Darlow Smithson and was written by Tony Saint, directed by Saul Metzstein and produced by Andrea Cornwell. It was produced as a BBC Drama, shot in the UK, with some scenes shot in and around the colleges of Cambridge on 15 July 2009. Computers were supplied by The Centre for Computing History, then in Haverhill.

The programme's titles use green lettering similar to that produced by the 1980s monitors to which BBC Microcomputers would have typically been connected.

Soundtrack 
The soundtrack uses a number of early 1980s electronica tracks:
 "Pulstar" by Vangelis
 "Zoolookologie" by Jean Michel Jarre
 "Oxygène (Part IV)" by Jean Michel Jarre
 "Two Tribes" by Frankie Goes to Hollywood
 "99 Red Balloons" by Nena
 "Pipes of Peace" by Paul McCartney
 "Another Brick in the Wall" by Pink Floyd
 "Title" from The Carpetbaggers by Jimmy Smith
 "Computer World 2" by Kraftwerk
 "Wouldn't It Be Good" by Nik Kershaw
 "Planet Earth" by Duran Duran

Release 
It was first shown on BBC Four on 8 October 2009.

Reaction
When asked about the programme in an interview for The Independent — despite being involved in the production — Sinclair himself stated: "It was a travesty of the truth. It just had no bearing on the truth. It was terrible."

See also
 Micro Live

References

External links 
 
 Micro Men on the British Comedy Guide
 
 The Guardian: Battle between ZX Spectrum and BBC Micro to be BBC4 comedy drama
 TechRadar article
 BitterWallet blog entry by Andy Dawson (09.10.2009, just a day after Micro Men was broadcast first)
 The Jitty: Interview with the British IBM

2009 British television series debuts
BBC television docudramas
Biographical films about computer and internet entrepreneurs
Documentary films about computer and internet entrepreneurs
History of computing in the United Kingdom
Science docudramas
British docudrama films
Films scored by Ilan Eshkeri